Shillong Cantonment is a cantonment town in East Khasi Hills district in the Indian state of Meghalaya.

Demographics
As of the 2001 India census, Shillong Cantonment had a population of 12,385. Males constitute 57% of the population and females 43%. Shillong Cantonment has an average literacy rate of 74%, higher than the national average of 59.5%: male literacy is 78%, and female literacy is 69%. In Shillong Cantonment, 12% of the population is under 6 years of age.

References

Cantonments of British India
Cantonments of India
Cities and towns in East Khasi Hills district